Save Our State (SOS), formerly known as Save Our Suburbs, was a community group concerned about the impact of contemporary development on established low-density residential suburbs in Australian cities.

It was established in Melbourne, Victoria in the mid-1990s and now has bases in New South Wales, South Australia, the Australian Capital Territory and Queensland. In Victoria, SOS has had significant influence on residential planning policy, most notably on the importance of neighbourhood character within the state's planning scheme and its delineation in the residential design code, 'ResCode', implemented in 2001. SOS's influence can also be seen in some of the key components of the Metropolitan Strategy, Melbourne 2030 regarding the focus on intensification of 'activity centres' in line with Transit-oriented development (TOD) principles and on aiming to protect existing residential areas.

SOS formation and rapid growth was a reaction to the planning policies of the Kennett government in Victoria during the 1990s, in particular the planning code known as 'The Good Design Guide for Medium Density Housing'. A measure of the significance of the issues that SOS campaigns about and the profile thus gained is indicated by SOS securing registered political party status in New South Wales and fielding candidates in the 2007 New South Wales state election. The party changed its name to "Save Our State" in 2010.

See also
 Suburb
 Suburban sprawl
 Automobile dependency
 Transit-oriented development
 Smart growth
 NIMBY

References 
 Lewis, M. (1999) Suburban backlash : the battle for the world's most liveable city, Hawthorn, Vic. : Bloomings Books,

External links 
 Save Our Suburbs (Vic)
  Save Our Suburbs (NSW) Inc
 Save Our Suburbs (Adelaide) Evonne Moore
  (Transcript of interview with Tony Recsei, from Save Our Suburbs, Sydney)

Urban planning in Australia
Political advocacy groups in Australia
Organisations based in Melbourne
Defunct political parties in Australia